Qinhuangdao Beidaihe Airport  is an airport serving the city of Qinhuangdao, Hebei Province, China.

History
The Beidaihe Airport project was started in 2004, and received approval from the State Council in July 2009. The construction feasibility report was approved in May 2011, and construction officially began in April 2012. The airport was opened on 31 March 2016, replacing the old Shanhaiguan Airport, which was shared with the military, as Qinhuangdao's main airport. Shanhaiguan Airport reverted to sole military use.

Facilities
The airport occupies an area of 2,195 mu. It has a runway that is 2,600 meters long and 60 meters wide, and a  terminal building. It is designed to handle 500,000 passengers and 1,200 tons of cargo annually.

Airlines and destinations

See also
List of airports in China
List of the busiest airports in China

References

Airports in Hebei
Airports established in 2016
Buildings and structures in Qinhuangdao
2016 establishments in China